The women's 48 kilograms event at the 2014 Asian Games took place on 20 September 2014 at Moonlight Festival Garden Weightlifting Venue in Incheon, South Korea.

Schedule
All times are Korea Standard Time (UTC+09:00)

Records 

 Nurcan Taylan's world record was rescinded in 2021.

Results 
Legend
NM — No mark

References

External links
 Official website

Weightlifting at the 2014 Asian Games